A Hero Never Dies  is a 1998 Hong Kong action crime drama, and the first Milkyway Image film to be directed by Johnnie To.

Starring Leon Lai and Lau Ching-wan, A Hero Never Dies is a heroic bloodshed tale centering on the friendship and rivalry of two Triads in the midst of a gang war. The film has often been compared to the 1986 Hong Kong film A Better Tomorrow as both men wind up being betrayed by their bosses.

Cast and roles
 Leon Lai as Jack
 Lau Ching-wan as Martin
 Fiona Leung as Fiona, Martin's girlfriend
 Yoyo Mung as Yoyo, Jack's girlfriend
 Henry Fong as Mr. Fong
 Yen Shi-Kwan as Boss Yam
 Keiji Sato as Killer
 Michael Lam as Bodyguard
 Yuen Bun
 Cheung Chi-ping
 Lam Suet
 Chiu Chi-shing
 Law Ching-ting
 Wong Tin-lam as Wong
 Law Wing-cheung
 Philip Keung

References

External links
 
 Hong Kong Cinemagic entry
 A Hero Never Dies at hkmdb.com

1998 films
1998 action thriller films
1998 crime drama films
Hong Kong action thriller films
Films directed by Johnnie To
Milkyway Image films
Gun fu films
1990s Cantonese-language films
Films set in Hong Kong
Films shot in Hong Kong
1998 drama films
1990s Hong Kong films